Karolína Frederiksen (born 1 August 1981 in Chrudim as Karolína Pilařová) is a Czech curler who participated in the European Curling Championships in 2004, 2005, 2006 and 2009. The best result was 8th place in 2006 and then 2 out of 2 wins in a challenge game against Austria which allowed the Czech team to compete at the 2007 World Women's Curling Championships, the first time in the history of the country. The historical appearance came in Aomori, Aomori, Japan from 17–25 March, where they achieved 11th place. She participated in the 2008 European Mixed Curling Championship where she reached the finals and was awarded a silver medal.

She plays lead for Hana Synáčkova and is a multiple Czech champion.

In 2012 she married a fellow curler and coach Sune Frederiksen and change surname to Frederiksen.

References

External links

Living people
1981 births
People from Chrudim
Czech female curlers
Czech curling champions
Czech curling coaches
Sportspeople from the Pardubice Region